Karamone F.C. is a Nigeria football club based in Oyo. They play in the Nigeria Football Federation Cup. They have different stages of football age levels of senior team and under ages.

They have produced top professional football players for west African national teams of all levels and some players plying their trade in Africa, Europe, Asia and America top league teams. Karamone Football Club now having both male and female team known as Karamone F.C. and Karamone Ladies in 4 different age categories (U13, U17, U19 and Senior)

Notable players
 Raimi Kola
 Austin Amutu
 Etor Daniel
 Ibrahim Mustapha
 Akande Tope
 Ubong Williams
 Abiodun Akande
 Dayo Ojo
 Feyiseitan Asagidigbi
 Chiamaka Madu
 Razaq Adegbite
 Adegbite Al-Ameen Adeniyi
 Moshood Kabiru
 Halilu Obadaki
 Abdulwaheed Afolabi
 Alao Dabani Godwin

 Kelechi Harrison
 Christian Omeruo
 Amaechi Tochukwu
 Bello Rouchdane
 Prince Hadedeji Mayungbe
 Bashiru Sheriff Akanji

References

 Eze Fidelis Joined Shooting Stars FC
 Austin Amutu

Football clubs in Nigeria
Sports clubs in Nigeria